William Nichol Eskridge Jr. (born October 27, 1951 in Princeton, West Virginia) is the John A. Garver Professor of Jurisprudence at Yale Law School. He is one of the most cited law professors in America, ranking fourth overall for the period 2016–2020. He writes primarily on constitutional law, legislation and statutory interpretation, religion, marriage equality, and LGBT rights.

After earning a BA in history from Davidson College in 1973, he completed an MA in history at Harvard University and then earned a JD from Yale Law School in 1978. At Yale he was an editor of the Yale Law Journal, where he worked with future Supreme Court Justice Sonia Sotomayor. After graduating from Yale he clerked for Judge Edward Weinfeld on the US District Court for the Southern District of New York and then joined the DC law firm Shea & Gardner. Before joining the Yale Law faculty he was a professor at the University of Virginia School of Law (1982–1987) and Georgetown Law (1987–1998).

In 1994, Eskridge was granted a Guggenheim Fellowship.

Legislation and statutory interpretation
With his Shea & Gardner friend, the late Phil Frickey, Eskridge developed a field-establishing casebook, Statutes and the Creation of Public Policy, published by the West Publishing Company in 1987 (now in its fifth edition). The Eskridge and Frickey materials were part of Eskridge's file for tenure at the University of Virginia, whose tenure committee largely dismissed the contribution, in part because it devoted too much discussion to the canons and theories of statutory interpretation. In the Virginia Law Review, Judge Richard Posner's review of the Eskridge and Frickey book had a different view. Judge Posner argued that the book essentially established the intellectual bona fides of a new and critically important field (Legislation) and that it ranked among the great landmark casebooks of the twentieth century. Legislation and Statutory Interpretation immediately emerged as a vibrant and important field of study, doctrinal development, and intellectual engagement. Eskridge subsequently published a series of classic articles (usually co-authored with Phil Frickey) developing themes first announced in the casebook. For example, Eskridge's 1990 article titled "The New Textualism" is the 75th most-cited law review article of all time, according to a 2012 study.

In 1994, Eskridge and Frickey published Hart and Sacks's The Legal Process (Foundation Press, 1994), with an historical and critical introduction to the highly influential legal process teaching materials originally developed by Henry Hart and Albert Sacks at Harvard Law School, but never published. In the same year, Eskridge and Frickey were asked to write the foreword to the Harvard Law Review Supreme Court issue.

Sexuality, gender, identity, and the law 
Between 1990 and 1995, Eskridge represented a gay couple seeking a marriage license in Washington, DC. Like all the other early same-sex marriage cases, this one did not prevail, but for the first time in American history, one judge, John Ferren of the DC Court of Appeals, wrote an opinion finding discrimination against same-sex couples to be unconstitutional (Dean v. District of Columbia, 653 A.2d 307 (D.C. 1995)).

In 1996, Eskridge wrote his pathfinding book "The Case for Same-Sex Marriage" (Free Press 1996), which argued that marriage discrimination against LGBT couples violated both their fundamental right to marry and their equal protection right to be free of invidious state discrimination. The book was criticized at the time, with West Virginia US Senator Robert Byrd quoting extensively from it in his speech supporting the Defense of Marriage Act in 1996, an overwhelming, bipartisan rebuke to the marriage movement. Ultimately, many state courts and the US Supreme Court (Obergefell v. Hodges (2015)) adopted these arguments in favor of gay marriage. As Judge Posner put it in a 2015 "re-review" of Eskridge's 1996 book:  "A prophet before his time, William Eskridge has the satisfaction of having finally been vindicated."

At the same time he was working on marriage rights for LGBT persons, Eskridge was working with Georgetown law professor Nan Hunter on teaching materials for a field they dubbed "Sexuality, Gender, identity, and the Law". Eskridge and Hunter rejected the idea that the field should be defined as "Sexual Orientation and the Law", because they considered norms of gender and sexuality inextricably intertwined. Published by Foundation Press, Sexuality, Gender, and the Law is now in its third edition, with a fourth being prepared in 2017. Emerging from his work with Hunter, Eskridge published a series of articles on sodomy laws and other discriminatory laws harming gender and sexual minorities. An amicus brief he wrote for the Cato Institute and a law review article titled "Hardwick and Historiography". were cited by the majority opinion in Lawrence v. Texas (2003), where the Supreme Court invalidated consensual sodomy laws. Several paragraphs

Consumer law
Writing in 1984, Eskridge was the first legal scholar to argue that home buyers were taking on too much risk, especially in light of the market's creation of new kinds of loans, with adjustable rates and other financial gimmicks.

Bibliography

Books
 Gaylaw: Challenging the Apartheid of the Closet (1999)
 The Case for Same-Sex Marriage: From Sexual Liberty to Civilized Commitment (1996)
 Dynamic Statutory Interpretation (1994)

Articles 
 "The First Marriage Cases, 1970-74," in Love Unites Us: Winning the Freedom to Marry in America 21-27 (Kevin M. Cathcart & Leslie J. Gabel-Brett, eds., 2016)
 "Law and the Production of Deceit," in Austin Sarat ed., Law and Lies: Deception and Truth-Telling in the American Legal System 254-312 (2015)
 "Original Meaning and Marriage Equality," 52 Hous. L. Rev. 1067 (2015)
 "Congressional Overrides of Supreme Court Statutory Interpretation Decisions, 1967-2011," 92 Tex. L. Rev. 1317 (2014) (with Matthew R. Christiansen) 
 "Backlash Politics: How Constitutional Litigation Has Advanced Marriage Equality in the United States," 93 B.U.L. Rev. 275 (2013)
 "Expanding Chevron'''s Domain:  A Comparative Institutional Analysis of the Relative Competence of Courts and Agencies to Interpret Statutes," 2013 Wis. L. Rev. 411
 "The New Texualism and Normative Canons," 113 Colum. L. Rev. 531 (2013) (book review)
 "Marriage Equality: An Idea Whose Time Is Coming," 37 NYU Rev. L. & Soc. Change 245 (2013)
 "Nino's Nightmare: Legal Process Theory  as a Jurisprudence of Toggling Between Facts and Norms," 57 St. Louis U.L. Rev. 865 (2012)
 "Vetogates and American Public Law," J.L. Econ. & Org. (April 2012)
 "Family Law Pluralism: A Guided-Choice Regime of Menus, Default Rules, and Override Rules," 100 Geo. L.J. 1881 (2012) 
 "Noah's Curse:  How Religion Often Conflates Status, Belief, and Conduct to Resist Antidiscrimination Norms," 45 Ga. L. Rev. 657 (2011)
 "Is Political Powerlessness a Requirement for Heightened Equal Protection Scrutiny?," 50 Washburn L.J. 1 (2010)
 "Chevron as a Canon, Not a Precedent: An Empirical Study of What Motivates Justices in Agency Deference Cases," 110 Colum. L. Rev. 1727 (2010) (with Connor N. Raso) 
 "The California Proposition 8 Case:  What Is a Constitution For," 98 Cal. L. Rev. 1235 (2010)
 "Sexual and Gender Variation in American Public Law: From Malignant to Tolerable to Benign," 57 UCAL L. Rev. 1333 (2010) 
 "The California Supreme Court, 2007-2008—Foreword: The Marriage Cases, Reversing the Burden of Inertia in a Pluralist Democracy," Cal. L. Rev. (2009) 
 "A Pluralist Theory of Equal Protection," U. Pa. J. Const'l L. (2009) 
 Constitutional Horticulture: Deliberation-Respecting Judicial Review, 87 Tex. L. Rev. 1273 (2009) (with John Ferejohn) 
 Vetogates, Preemption, Chevron, 83 Notre Dame L. Rev. 1441 (2008) 
 The Continuum of Deference: Supreme Court Treatment of Agency Statutory Interpretations from Chevron to Hamdan, 96 Geo. L.J. 1083 (2008) (co-authored with Lauren Baer) (the Ryan Lecture) 
 America's Statutory Constitution, 41 U.C. Davis L. Rev. 1 (2007) (the Barrett Lecture)
 No Frills Textualism, 119 Harv. L. Rev. 2041 (2006) (book review) 
 Chevron and Agency Norm Entrepreneurship, 115 Yale L.J. 2623 (2006) (essay co-authored with Kevin Schwartz) 
 Body Politics:  Lawrence v. Texas and the Constitution of Disgust and Contagion, 57 Fla. L. Rev. 1011 (2005) (the Dunwoody Lecture)
 Pluralism and Distrust: How Courts Can Support Democracy by Lowering the Stakes of Politics, 114 Yale L.J. 1279 (2005) 
 Lawrence v. Texas and the Imperative of Comparative Constitutionalism, 2 Int'l J. Const'l L. 555 (2004)
 Lawrence's Jurisprudence of Tolerance: Judicial Review to Lower the Stakes of Identity Politics, 88 Minn. L. Rev. 1021 (2004)
 Some Effects of Identity-Based Social Movements on Constitutional Law in the Twentieth Century, 100 Mich. L. Rev. 2062 (2002)
 Structuring Lawmaking to Reduce Cognitive Bias: A Critical View, 87 Cornell L. Rev. 616 (2002)
 Channeling: Identity-Based Social Movements and Public Law, 150 U. Pa. L. Rev. 419 (2001) 
 All About Words: Early Understandings of the Judicial Power in Statutory Interpretation, 1776-1806, 101 Colum. L. Rev. 999 (2001)
 The Relationship Between Obligations and Rights of Citizens, 69 Fordham L. Rev. 1721 (2001) 
 Super-Statutes, 50 Duke L.J. 1215 (2001) (co-authored with John Ferejohn) 
 Equality Practice: Reflections on the Jurisprudence of Civil Unions, 64 Alb. L.J. 853 (2001) (Sobota Lecture)
 January 27, 1961: The Birth of Gaylegal Equality Arguments, 58 NYU Ann. Survey Am. Law 39 (2001) 
 No Promo Homo: The Sedimentation of Antigay Discourse and the Channeling Effect of Judicial Review, 75 NYU L. Rev. 1327 (2000)
 Destabilizing Due Process and Evolutive Equal Protection, 47 UCLA L. Rev. 1183 (2000)
 Comparative Law and the Same-Sex Marriage Debate: A Step-by-Step Approach Toward Recognizing Gay Unions, 31 McGeo. L.J. 641 (2000) 
 The Circumstances of Politics and the Application of Statutes, 100 Colum. L. Rev. 558 (2000) 
 Multivocal Prejudices and Homo Equality, 100 Ind. L.J. 558 (1999) (Harris Lecture) 
 Norms, Empiricism, and Canons in Statutory Interpretation, 66 U. Chi. L. Rev. 671 (1999) 
 Hardwick and Historiography, 1999 U. Ill. L. Rev. 631 (Baum Lecture) 
 Relationships Between Formalism and Functionalism in Separation of Powers Cases, 22 Harv. J.L. & Pub. Pol=y 21 (1998) 
 Should the Supreme Court Read the Federalist But Not Statutory Legislative History?, 66 Geo. Wash. L. Rev. 1301 (1998) 
 Textualism, the Unknown Ideal, 96 Mich. L. Rev. 1509 (1998) (book review)
 Jurisprudence of Coming Out: Religion, Sexuality, and Liberty/Equality Collisions in Public Law, 106 Yale L.J. 2411 (1997)
 Privacy Jurisprudence and the Apartheid of the Closet, 1946-1961, 24 Fla. St. U.L. Rev. 703 (1997) (Mason Ladd Lecture) 
 Challenging the Apartheid of the Closet: Establishing Conditions for Lesbian and Gay Intimacy, Nomos, and Citizenship, 1961-1981, 25 Hofstra L. Rev. 817 (1997) (Visiting Scholar in Residence Lecture) 
 Willard Hurst, Master of the Legal Process, 1997 Wis. L. Rev. 1181
 From the Sodomite to the Homosexual:  American Regulation of Same-Sex Intimacy, 1885-1945, 82 Iowa L. Rev. (1997) (Murray Lecture) 
 Steadying the Court's Unsteady Path: A Theory of Judicial Enforcement of Federalism, 68 U. So. Cal. L. Rev. 1447 (1995) (co-authored with Jenna Bednar)
 Virtual Logrolling:  How the Court, Congress, and the States Multiply Rights, 68 U. So. Cal. L. Rev. 1545 (1995)
 Regulatory Variables and Statutory Interpretation, 73 Wash. U.L.Q. 1103 (1995) (co-authored with Judith Levi)
 Fetch Some Soupmeat, 16 Cardozo L. Rev. 2209 (1995)
 The Supreme Court, 1993 Term B Foreword:  Law as Equilibrium, 108 Harv. L. Rev. 26 (1994) (co-authored with Philip Frickey)
 The Elastic Commerce Clause:  A Political Theory of  American Federalism, 49 Vand. L. Rev. 1355 (1994) (co-authored with John Ferejohn)
 The Making of The Legal Process, 107 Harv. L. Rev. 2031 (1994) (essay, co-authored with Philip Frickey)
 From Handholding to Sodomy: The First Amendment and the Regulation of Homosexual Conduct, 29 Harv. C.R.-C.L. L. Rev. 319 (1994) (co-authored with David Cole)
 The Economics Epidemic in an AIDS Perspective, 61 U. Chi. L. Rev. 733 (1994) (review essay co-authored with Brian Weimer)
 Gaylegal Narratives, 46 Stan. L. Rev. 607 (1994)
 Post-Enactment Legislative Signals, 57 Law & Contemp. Probs. 75 (Winter 1994)
 The Judicial Review Game, 88 Nw. U.L. Rev. 382 (1993)
 Race and Sexual Orientation in the Military: Ending the Apartheid of the Closet, 2 Reconstruction 52 (1993)
 The Case of the Speluncean Explorers: Twentieth Century Statutory Interpretation in a Nutshell, 61 Geo. Wash. L. Rev. 1731 (1993)
 A History of Same-Sex Marriage, 79 Va. L. Rev. 1419 (1993)
 The Relationship Between Theories of Legislatures and Theories of Statutory Interpretation, in The Rule of Law (Nomos, 1993) (co-authored with John Ferejohn)
 Gay Constructionist Critique of Posner's Sex and Reason: Steps Toward a Gaylegal Agenda, 102 Yale L.J. 333 (1992) (review essay)
 Quasi-Constitutional Law: Clear Statement Rules as Constitutional Lawmaking, 45 Vand. L. Rev. 593 (1992) (co-authored with Philip Frickey)
 The Article I, Section 7 Game, 80 Geo. L.J. 523 (1992) (co-authored with John Ferejohn)
 Overriding Supreme Court Statutory Interpretation Decisions, 101 Yale L.J. 331 (1991)
 Making the Deal Stick:  Enforcing the Original Constitutional Understanding, J.L. Econ & Org. (1991) (co-authored with John Ferejohn)
 Reneging on History?  Playing the Court/Congress/President Civil Rights Game, 79 Cal. L. Rev. 613 (1991)
 The New Public Law Movement: Moderation as a Postmodern Cultural Form, 89 Mich. L. Rev. 707 (1991) (co-authored with Gary Peller)  
 The Case of the Amorous Defendant: Criticizing Absolute Stare Decisis for Statutory Cases), 88 Mich. L. Rev. 2450 (1990)
 Legislative History Values, 66 Chi.-Kent L. Rev. (1990)
 Dynamic Interpretation of Economic Regulatory Statutes, 21 L. & Pol'y Int'l Bus. 663 (1990)
 Gadamer/Statutory Interpretation, 90 Colum. L. Rev. 609  (1990)
 The New Textualism, 37 UCLA L. Rev. 621 (1990)
 Statutory Interpretation as Practical Reasoning, 42 Stan. L. Rev. 321 (1990) (co-authored with Philip Frickey)
 Spinning Legislative Supremacy, 78 Geo. L.J. 319 (1989)
 Public Values in Statutory Interpretation, 137 U. Pa. L. Rev. 1007 (1989)
 Metaprocedure, 98 Yale L.J. 945 (1989) (review essay)
 Interpreting Legislative Inaction, 87 Mich. L. Rev. 67 (1988)
 Overruling Statutory Precedents, 76 Geo. L.J. 1361 (1988)
 Politics Without Romance: Implications of Public Choice Theory for Statutory Interpretation, 74 Va. L. Rev. 275 (1988)
 Dynamic Statutory Interpretation, 135 U. Pa. L. Rev. 1479 (1987)
 Legislation Scholarship & Pedagogy in the Post-Legal Process Era, 48 U. Pitt. L. Rev. 691 (1987) (co-authored with Philip Frickey)
 Les Jeux Sont Faits: Structural Origins of the International Debt Problem, 25 Va. J. Int'l L. 281 (1985)
 One Hundred Years of Ineptitude, 70 Va. l. Rev. 1083 (1984)
 The Iranian Nationalization Cases, 22 Harv. Int'l L.J. 525 (1981)
 Dunlop v. Bachowski'' & the Limits of Judicial Review under Title IV of the LMRDA, 86 Yale L.J. 885 (1977) (student note)

References

1951 births
Davidson College alumni
Georgetown University Law Center faculty
living people
people from Princeton, West Virginia
Stonewall Book Award winners
University of Wisconsin–Madison faculty
Yale Law School alumni
Yale Law School faculty
Harvard University alumni